The 2018 Jackson State Tigers football team  represented Jackson State University in the 2018 NCAA Division I FCS football season. The Tigers were led by second-year head coach Tony Hughes and played their home games at Mississippi Veterans Memorial Stadium in Jackson, Mississippi as members of the East Division of the Southwestern Athletic Conference (SWAC).

Previous season
The Tigers finished the 2017 season 3–8, 3–4 in SWAC play to finish in fourth place in the East Division.

Preseason

SWAC football media day
During the SWAC football media day held in Birmingham, Alabama on July 13, 2018, the Tigers were predicted to finish third in the East Division. They did not have any players selected to any of the Presason All-SWAC Teams.

Media poll

Schedule

Game summaries

at Southern Miss

at Florida A&M

Alabama A&M

at Arkansas–Pine Bluff

Mississippi Valley State

North Alabama

at Southern

Prairie View A&M

at Alabama State

at Alcorn State

References

Jackson State
Jackson State Tigers football seasons
Jackson State Tigers football